The Charles H. Kellstadt Graduate School of Business is part of the DePaul University Driehaus College of Business, a business school located in the Chicago Loop, Illinois, United States. The Driehaus College of Business (called the College of Commerce until 2012) was founded in 1912 and is one of the ten oldest business schools in the U.S. The school is accredited by the Association to Advance Collegiate Schools of Business-International. In the fall of 2012, Kellstadt enrolled 2,107 students.

History
DePaul’s College of Commerce began offering business classes in January 1913, becoming one of the 10 oldest business schools in the nation and the first at a U.S. Roman Catholic university. The college established a Master of Business Administration program in 1948 and launched the Graduate School of Business. The college, including the Graduate School of Business, moved to its current Chicago location in the DePaul Center, 1 E. Jackson Blvd., in 1993.

In 1971, Commerce established its first center, the Small Business Institute. In 1977, Commerce began offering graduate classes at the university’s suburban sites. Commerce established the Center for Market Analysis and Planning through a $1 million gift from the Charles H. Kellstadt Trust in 1982. In 1983, DePaul was awarded a $1 million gift from the Dr. Scholl Foundation to establish an endowed chair in its College of Commerce and Department of Finance. The Center for Business Ethics was launched in 1984. In 1986, Commerce received another $1 million grant from the Kellstadt Foundation to establish the Kellstadt Center for Marketing Analysis and Planning in Administration Center.

In 1988, the five-year Arthur Andersen & Co. Alumni Distinguished Professorship in accountancy and the Touche Ross Distinguished Professorship in accountancy were established.

In 1992, DePaul received a $9 million gift from the Kellstadt Foundation to establish the Kellstadt Graduate School of Business, named for Charles H. Kellstadt, former president, chairman and chief executive officer of Sears, Roebuck and Co.

In 1997, Kellstadt launched its first overseas part-time MBA program in Hong Kong, that program terminated in 2005. In 2000, Kellstadt added a part-time MBA program in Bahrain. In 2002, it added another in the Czech Republic through a partnership with the Czech Management Center, and that program terminated in 2009. The program’s most recent overseas program was created in Taiwan in 2006 and terminated in 2010.

In 2002, Kellstadt created the Real Estate Center, under the direction of Professor Susanne E. Cannon. In 2006, the center received three gifts in excess of $1 million: $4 million from the Michael J. Horne Foundation to endow the Horne Chair in Real Estate Studies; $2 million from Douglas and Cynthia Crocker to endow the Doug and Cynthia Crocker Director of the Real Estate Center; and $1.5 million from George Ruff to endow the Ruff Chair in Real Estate Studies. In 2007, the MacArthur Foundation awarded the center a grant of $3.5 million to launch a  multi-faceted program to save affordable rental housing in the Chicago region.

In 2008, Dean Ray Whittington created the Department of Real Estate, carving it out of the Department of Finance. Professor Susanne E. Cannon was chosen as the first department's first chairperson. Also in 2008, the college received a $7.5 million gift from the Conrad N. Hilton Foundation to establish the School of Hospitality Leadership.

In 2012, DePaul alumnus Richard H. Driehaus gave DePaul a $30 million gift to be used to recruit and retain business faculty.  DePaul renamed the College of Commerce the Driehaus College of Business.  Part of the Driehaus College of Business, the Kellstadt Graduate School of Business retained its name.

Academics
Kellstadt has seven divisions: the School of Accountancy and Management Information Systems; the School of Hospitality Leadership; and the departments of finance, economics, marketing, management and real estate. The department of real estate and the School of Hospitality Leadership were created in 2008.

Kellstadt offers both a part-time and full-time Master of Business Administration. Students may choose among 30 MBA concentrations; a combined MBA/Juris Doctor with the DePaul University College of Law; 14 specialized master's degrees that provide in-depth knowledge in a particular area of business; and joint MBA/MS programs.

Kellstadt has 14 specialized centers and institutes that conduct research, host symposia and partner with local, national and international organizations to address issues within various fields. They include the Center for Creativity and Innovation and the Coleman Entrepreneurship Center among others.

Notable faculty
 Belverd Needles, the Ernst & Young Professor of Accountancy at DePaul, teaches financial reporting, auditing and corporate governance. He is the author of more than 20 books, including Principles of Accounting and Financial Accounting, which are used in classrooms around the world.

References

External links
 Official Web site
 DePaul College of Commerce
 DePaul University
 DePaul MBA Association

Business schools in Illinois
DePaul University
Educational institutions established in 1913
1913 establishments in Illinois